Ronald Francis Hingley (26 April 1920, Edinburgh – 23 January 2010) was an English scholar, translator and historian of Russia, specializing in Russian history and literature.

Hingley was the translator and editor of the nine-volume collection of Chekhov's works published by Oxford University Press between 1974 and 1980 (known as the Oxford Chekhov). He also wrote numerous books including biographies of Chekhov, Dostoyevsky, Stalin and Boris Pasternak. He won the James Tait Black Award for his 1976 biography A New Life of Anton Chekhov. He also translated several works of Russian literature, among them Alexander Solzhenitsyn's classic One Day in the Life of Ivan Denisovich which Hingley co-translated with Max Hayward.

He was a governing body fellow of St Antony's College, Oxford, from 1961 to 1987 and an emeritus fellow from 1987 onwards.

Selected works

 A Concise History of Russia (1972)
 Russia : A Concise History (1991)
 A Life of Chekhov (Oxford Lives) (1989)
 A New Life of Anton Chekhov (1976)
 Pasternak (1983)
 Dostoyevsky, his life and work (1978)
 Joseph Stalin: Man and Legend (Leaders of Our Time) (1974)
 The Undiscovered Dostoyevsky (1962)
 Nightingale fever: Russian poets in revolution (1981)
 Russian Writers and Society in the Nineteenth Century (1977)
 Russian Writers and Soviet Society, 1917-1978 (1979)
 The Russian Secret Police: Muscovite, Imperial Russian and Soviet Political Security Operations (1970)
 A People in Turmoil: Revolutions in Russia (1973)
 The Russian Mind (May 25, 1978) - "An extensive, anecdotal exploration of the Russian mind and character portrays salient behavior traits and attitudes and examines characteristic social and cultural phenomena."
 Russian Revolution (Bodley Head Contemporary History) (Oct 22, 1970)
 The Tsars, Russian Autocrats, 1533-1917 (1968)
 Czars  (1973)

References

1920 births
2010 deaths
English historians
English biographers
Fellows of St Antony's College, Oxford